Ronald John Cooke (born 5 April 1984) is a South African rugby union player, who most recently played domestically for the . His usual position is centre or wing.

He has played first class rugby since 2004 and spent the bulk of his career at French club , making 121 appearances between 2007 and 2012.

Career

Griquas

Cooke attended Hoërskool Noord-Kaap in Kimberley, where he was selected to represent Griquas at high school level.

Leopards / South Africa Under-21

Despite only playing for the final eight minutes of the match, Cooke scored his first try in the same in the 36–47 defeat. He started one more match in the competition, against the Border Bulldogs in East London, before reverting to the Under-20 side.

In 2005, Cooke was a key member of the Leopards team that competed in the 2005 Vodacom Cup competition; he started six of their seven matches during the group stage of the competition and scored six tries, the top try scorer for the Leopards in the competition and just one behind top try scorers Alshaun Bock and Renfred Dazel. Despite scoring two tries in the final, Cooke could not help them to victory, with  winning the match 27–25 to win their second Vodacom Cup title.

After the 2005 Vodacom Cup competition, he was also included in the South Africa Under-21 team that played at the 2005 Under 21 Rugby World Championship held in Argentina He made three appearances in the competition, helping South Africa to win the competition for the second time, beating Australia in the final.

He maintained his form from the Vodacom Cup competition to score six tries in seven appearances in the Currie Cup to again be the Leopards' top try scorer. However, he could not prevent the Leopards finishing bottom of the log and being relegated to the First Division in 2006.

Cheetahs / Griquas

Following the Leopards' relegation, Cooke returned to Kimberley, the city where he grew up and his parents still lived, to join  for 2006. While winger Eddie Fredericks scored the Cheetahs' first ever try in Super Rugby, Cooke scored their second, dotting down in the final minutes of an 18–30 defeat. He retained the number 13 jersey for the duration of the campaign, starting all thirteen of their matches as they finished in tenth position on the log.

Cooke made eleven appearances for the Cheetahs in the 2007 Super 14 season, scoring one try as the Cheetahs beat the  30–26 in Round Three of the competition, to help the Cheetahs finish the competition in eleventh spot on the log.

Brive

In October 2007, he joined French Top 14 team . He made his debut for them in their 15–6 victory over Irish side Connacht in the 2007–08 European Challenge Cup. He played in five of their six matches in the pool stage of the competition, helping them finish second in Pool 3 of the competition to qualify for the quarter finals. He also started their quarter final match against English side Sale Sharks, but could not prevent his side being beaten 24–49 to be knocked out of the competition. Domestically, he played in sixteen matches for Brive during the 2007–08 Top 14 season, starting twelve of those matches. He scored one try during the season in their match against Bourgoin in a 29–13 victory in Round 13 of the competition, helping Brive to finish in 11th position in the competition.

Cooke played in 23 of Brive's 26 matches during the 2008–09 Top 14 season, making 21 starts. He also made four appearances in the 2008–09 European Challenge Cup, scoring a try in the first minute of their pool stage match against the Newcastle Falcons as Brive topped Pool 4. Cooke scored two tries in their quarter final match against Worcester Warriors, but it was not enough as the English team ran out 29–18 winners to eliminate Brive at this stage of the competition for the second consecutive season.

Cooke made his debut in the Heineken Cup in their 2009–10 match against Leinster. He made a further three appearances and scored his first Heineken Cup try in their Round Six defeat to the Scarlets, but Brive had a disappointing season, losing all six of their matches in the pool stage of the competition. In the Top 14, they won 11 of their 26 matches to finish the season in ninth place. Cooke featured in 19 of their matches and scored tries in matches against Albi, Perpignan} and Bourgoin over the course of the season.

The 2010–11 Top 14 season was Cooke's most prolific season for Brive, as he scored five tries in twenty starts. However, it was a generally disappointing season for the side, as they won just 8 matches all season to finish in 12th place, just outside the relegation places. In contrast, they won all six of their matches in the 2010–11 European Challenge Cup pool stage to top Pool 2 of the competition. Cooke played in three matches in the competition, including both victories over second-placed side Sale Sharks, but he didn't feature in the knock-out stages as Irish side Munster beat Brive 42–37 in their quarter final match to eliminate the French side from the competition.

Brive repeated the feat of winning all six of their matches in the 2011–12 European Challenge Cup pool stage to top Pool 5 with the second-best record in the competition. Cooke featured in two of those six matches, before starting their 15–11 victory over Welsh side Scarlets in the quarter final and in his first semi-final appearance, which ended in a 0–19 defeat to fellow Top 14 side and eventual champions . Despite Cooke enjoying his best season with Brive in the European competitions, the team struggled in the 2011–12 Top 14; they finished in 13th position to be relegated to the Pro D2 competition for 2012–13. Cooke scored a single try in his 22 starts in the competition, in a 22–9 victory over fellow relegated side .

His contract expired at the end of the 2011–2012 and he left Brive, having made a total of 121 appearances in the Top 14, Heineken Cup and Challenge Cup competitions in five seasons.

Grenoble

After his contract with Brive expired, he joined fellow Top 14 team  at the start of the 2012–13 season as a medical joker, replacing the injured Aaron Bancroft. He made five appearances for the newly promoted Grenoble during the 2012–13 Top 14 season and a further two appearances in the 2012–13 European Challenge Cup, but failed to score in either competition.

Kings

He returned to South Africa to play for the Port Elizabeth-based  in the 2013 Super Rugby season. He became a key player for the Kings throughout the season, starting fifteen of their sixteen matches in the competition. Cooke started both matches, but could not prevent the Kings losing 42–44 on aggregate to lose their Super Rugby status for 2014.

Just two of those came during the regular season, as the Kings finished in second position on the log. A decision from the South African Rugby Union to increase the Premier Division from six teams to eight saw both finalists being promoted to the 2014 Currie Cup Premier Division.

Cooke didn't play any first class rugby at the start of the season following a decision by the Eastern Province Kings coaching staff to rest senior players during the 2014 Vodacom Cup. He was selected in the starting line-up for the  side that faced  in June 2014 in a tour match during their 2014 tour of South Africa. He played the entire match as the Kings suffered a 12–34 defeat. He started in all ten of their matches in the Eastern Province Kings' return to the Currie Cup Premier Division.

Cooke featured in five of the Eastern Province Kings' seven matches in the 2015 Vodacom Cup. His side only won three of their matches to finish the season in fifth spot on the Southern Section log to miss out on a quarter final berth. He also played in four matches in the 2015 Currie Cup Premier Division as the EP Kings marginally improved on their 2014 showing, finishing in seventh position, having won two matches.

Notes

References

South African rugby union players
Living people
1984 births
Eastern Province Elephants players
Southern Kings players
Griquas (rugby union) players
Cheetahs (rugby union) players
Leopards (rugby union) players
CA Brive players
FC Grenoble players
Rugby union players from Pretoria
White South African people
South African people of British descent
Rugby union centres